Arnaldo Taurisano (Milan, 18 November 1933 – Brescia, 7 May 2019) was an Italian professional basketball coach. In 2009, at the age of 76, he became member of the Italian Basketball Hall of Fame.

His career
He began his coaching career before reaching the thirties by the local clubs of Lombardy as Pavoniana Milano and Nuova Pallacanestro Vigevano.

In 1963 went north to the club of Pallacanestro Cantù as an assistant coach and heads of infrastructure departments. In 1965–66 season he had the first great opportunity to coach the men's section of Oransoda Cantù and led the team in the fifth place of Serie A with a 12–10 wins record. In 1969 he resumed the position as head coach of the team and began the golden period of his career that lasted over the decade of the 70s. After the first year (1969–70) where the team ranked 6th and the arrival of Pierluigi Marzorati, the next four year Forst Cantù emerged consistently as the third power of Italian League behind the classic superpowers of Ignis Varese and Simmenthal Milano. The 1974–75 season was one of the best for Arnaldo Taurisano after winning with his team the -unique in his career- Italian championship. The last three years at the same time, made Forst Cantù considerable force in European basketball after he led the club to three consecutive wins of the newly founded FIBA Korać Cup in three consecutive finals against Maes Pils (1973), Partizan (1973–74) and Ranko Žeravica's FC Barcelona (1974–75). In September 1975 Arnaldo Taurisano participated as Italian champion with Forst in the FIBA Intercontinental Cup held in the cities of Cantù and Varese. In a five games round with a record 4–1 wins and became world champions. During the year, the team took part in the FIBA European Champions Cup where reached the semifinals and finally eliminated by Mobilgirgi Varese. The second place in the regular season of Serie A sent Forst in the FIBA European Cup Winners' Cup of the next year. In this way given an opportunity to Taurisano to earn extra European titles leading Gabetti Cantù in three consecutive even and eventually victorious finals, while remaining extremely competitive in the domestic leagues. In 1979 he retired full days, experiences and titles from the small city of Cantù with the great team, leaving as a legacy a club ready το found at the top of Europe in the coming years.

His career continued oddly in basketball clubs moving between Serie A and Serie A2 until 1990.

Clubs
 1962–63 Vigevano
 1963–65 Cantù (Assistant/Juniors)
 1965–66 Cantù
 1966–69 Cantù (Assistant/Juniors)
 1969–79 Cantù
 1979–80 Rimini
 1980–82 Lazio Roma
 1982–84 Partenope Napoli
 1984–86 Brescia
 1986–88 Partenope Napoli
 1988–90 Pavia

Career achievements and awards

Club competitions
 FIBA Intercontinental Cup: 1 (with Cantù: 1975)
 FIBA Cup Winners' Cup: 3 (with Cantù: 1976–77, 1977–78, 1978–79)
 FIBA Korać Cup: 3 (with Cantù: 1973, 1973–74, 1974–75)

also

 FIBA European Champions Cup semifinalist – (with Cantù: 1975–76)
 Italian League: 1 (with Cantù: 1974–75)

Personal awards
Member of the Italian Basketball Hall of Fame (2009)

References

External links
Italian League Profile 

1933 births
2019 deaths
Italian basketball coaches
Pallacanestro Cantù coaches
Basket Rimini Crabs coaches